The Modern Automotive District is a  historic district in Bowling Green, Kentucky which was listed on the National Register of Historic Places in 2006.

It includes three contributing buildings on the Dixie Highway:
Galloway Farm Equipment Company, at 538 State,
Hardcastle Filling Station, at 600 State, and
Galloway Motor Company, at 601 State St.

The two Galloway buildings were designed by architect James Ingram.

References

National Register of Historic Places in Bowling Green, Kentucky
Moderne architecture in the United States
Commercial buildings completed in 1948
Transportation in Warren County, Kentucky
Auto rows
Commercial buildings on the National Register of Historic Places in Kentucky
Transportation buildings and structures on the National Register of Historic Places in Kentucky
Historic districts on the National Register of Historic Places in Kentucky